Site 32 SL-O (Salt Lake-Omaha) Intermediate Field Historic District, also known as the Medicine Bow Airport , is an early lighted airway on the Transcontinental Airway System, located just south of the town of Medicine Bow, Wyoming. The airport was built one mile west, then moved to this location in 1929, as an emergency landing field on Route T, the New York to San Francisco airway, between larger airfields at Salt Lake and Omaha. It included a constantly-lit beacon and a cement arrow which pointed the way to the next beacon along the airway route.

References

National Register of Historic Places in Carbon County, Wyoming
Airports in Wyoming